The 1873 Wisconsin gubernatorial election was held on November 4, 1873. Democratic Party candidate William Robert Taylor was elected with 55% of the vote, defeating incumbent Republican Governor Cadwallader C. Washburn.  

Taylor was the first Democrat elected Governor of Wisconsin since William A. Barstow in 1853.  He was nominated as the consensus candidate of the "Reform Party,"—a coalition of Democrats, Liberal Republicans, and Grangers, on a platform of political and economy reform.

Democratic (Reform) Party
William Robert Taylor, at the time of the 1873 election, was a Trustee for the State Hospital of the Insane.  Previously, he had served as President of the state agriculture society, had been chairman of the Cottage Grove town board, and the Dane County board of supervisors, and had been a member of the Wisconsin State Senate and Assembly.

Republican Party
Cadwallader C. Washburn was the incumbent Governor of Wisconsin, having been elected in the 1871 election.  Prior to becoming Governor, he had served ten years in the United States House of Representatives and had served as a Union Army general in the American Civil War under Ulysses S. Grant.

Results

References

1873
Wisconsin
1873 Wisconsin elections